The District Council of Woolundunga was a local government area in South Australia from 1888 until 1933.

History
It was created on 5 January 1888 as the District Council of Davenport under the provisions of the District Councils Act 1887, but was renamed Woolundunga on 8 June 1893 to avoid confusion with the adjacent Corporate Town of Davenport, a separate municipality. The principal township was Stirling North. The council constructed purpose-built chambers at Stirling North in 1894, and operated out of them for the remainder of their existence.

By 1923, the council controlled an area of approximately 212,000 acres in 1923, with 32 miles of main roads. It had an estimated 472 persons in 200 dwellings, with the capital value of ratable property in that year being £142,280. In the ten years prior, the area had transitioned "almost entirely" from wheat to sheep farming. It was reported to have retained a similar population in 1936. On 28 April 1932, part of Woolundunga, along with the Corporate Town of Davenport and the Corporate Town of Port Augusta West, merged into the existing Corporate Town of Port Augusta. Most of the remaining sections of the municipality merged with the District Council of Hammond and part of the District Council of Port Germein as the recreated District Council of Wilmington on 16 February 1933; a section of Woolundunga was also merged into the District Council of Kanyaka as its Mundallio Ward.

Chairmen
 W. G. Pryor (1911–1916) 
 W. Drennan (1916–1918) 
 F. H. Lehmann (1918–1921) 
 J. H. Prosser (1921–1922) 
 F. H. Lehmann (1922–1923)

References

Woolundunga, District Council of
1888 establishments in Australia
1933 disestablishments in Australia